Sherif El-Saket (born 22 January 1970) is an Egyptian table tennis player. He competed in the men's singles event at the 1988 Summer Olympics.

References

1970 births
Living people
Egyptian male table tennis players
Olympic table tennis players of Egypt
Table tennis players at the 1988 Summer Olympics
Place of birth missing (living people)